Scythians were an ancient Iranian people of the Pontic steppe.

Scythian may also refer to:

History

Ancient historical group
 Scythian languages, a group of Eastern Iranian languages
 Scythia, a region in Central Eurasia
 Scythian religion, the religion of the Scythians
 Scythian cultures, a groups of similar Iron Age cultures on the Eurasian Steppe
 Scythian art, art produced by the Scythian cultures

Roman Empire and Byzantium
 Scythian Monks, Christian monks from Scythian Minor of the Roman Empire
 John the Scythian, Eastern Roman Empire military officer
 Andrew the Scythian, Byzantine military officer

Other uses
 Scythian (band), U.S. Celtic rock band
 The Scythian, a 2018 Russian swords-and-sandals-and-sorcery film
 , a WWII Royal Navy S-class submarine
 Scythian (geologic stage), the former name of the Early Triassic

See also
 
 
 Scythe (disambiguation)
 Scythia (disambiguation)
 Saka (disambiguation)
 Shaka (disambiguation)